This is a list of wars involving South Korea and its predecessor states.

List

Goryeo: 918–1392

Joseon: 1392–1897

Korean Empire: 1897–1910

Occupied Korea: 1910–1945

South Korea: 1948–present

See also

 Republic of Korea Armed Forces
 List of wars involving Korea
 List of wars involving North Korea

References

External links
The Korean War:
 Korean War resources, Dwight D. Eisenhower Presidential Library
 North Korea International Documentation Project
 Grand Valley State University Veteran's History Project digital collection
 The Forgotten War, Remembered – four testimonials in The New York Times
 Collection of Books and Research Materials on the Korean War an online collection of the United States Army Center of Military History
 The Korean War at History.com
 Korean-War.com
 Koreanwar-educator.org
Capital Mechanized Infantry Division, a division that fought in Korea and Vietnam:
 ROMAD with Korean Tiger Division, DASF's No's 1-7 listed with photos
 Photo of Commanding General of ROKF-V, LTG. Chae Myung Shin
 Photo of a Forward Observation Post (OP) of the 6th Company, ROK Blue Dragon Marine Corp.(2) – Vietnam 1970
 http://www.vietvet.co.kr/
 https://web.archive.org/web/20070930161928/http://cafe3.ktdom.com/vietvet/us/us.htm

South Korea
Wars